The SF series is a feature and short films concept by Japanese director Hiroyuki Nakano.

Episodes
1998.08: SF・サムライ・フィクション, feature film ( Samurai Fiction, a.k.a. SF: episode 1)
2001.06: SF・Stereo Future, feature film (a.k.a. Stereo Future)
2002.XX: SF・Sweet Female, short film
2003.03: SF・Sonic Four, short film
2003.03: SF・Short Films, short films compilation
2003.06: SF Short Films 2 Round:2 Splash Dance, short film (a.k.a. Splash Dance)

Trivia
French and German subtitled versions of the first SF episode (Samurai Fiction) were broadcast in Europe on July 20, 2000 on the French-German public channel Arte ¹. The movie was broadcast a second time circa 2005.

External links
 Episode one director & score composer interview w/videos (French)
 Episode one director & score composer interview w/videos (German)

Japanese film series